Moving Castle Concert Live @ H.K. is S.H.E's second live album, released on 22 December 2006. The songs are recordings from their concert at the Hong Kong Coliseum during their Moving Castle World Tour. The album contains a bonus DVD that chronicles S.H.E's five years in the entertainment industry. The DVD version of the Hong Kong concert was released later on January 22, 2007.

During the concert, each member provided her own performance and sang solos of her favourite songs. The album has five fewer talking segments than Fantasy Land Tour 2004 in Taipei.

Track listing

Notes

S.H.E albums
HIM International Music albums
2006 live albums